Temyasovo (Temäs) is a rural locality (a selo) and the administrative centre of Temyasovsky Selsoviet, Baymaksky District, Bashkortostan, Russia. The population was 3,529 as of 2010. There are 46 streets.

Geography 
Temyasovo is located 55 km north of Baymak (the district's administrative centre) by road. Verkhneidrisovo is the nearest rural locality.

References 

Rural localities in Baymaksky District